The 2012 Campeonato Rondoniense was the 18th season of Rondônia's top professional football league. The competition began 31 March and ended 9 June. Esporte Clube Espigão was the defending champion.

Format
The eight clubs played a double round robin format. The best four teams advanced to the semifinals.

Qualifications
The first stage champions qualified for Série D. The champion qualified for 2013 Copa do Brasil.

Participating teams

First stage

Semifinals

Finals

Finals

First leg

Second leg

Ji-Paraná won 4-6 on aggregate

References

2012 Campeonato Rondoniense on www.rsssfbrasil.com

External links
http://www.futeboldonorte.com/ 

Ron